The Battle of Aljubarrota (see Aljubarrota) was fought between the Kingdom of Portugal and the Crown of Castile on 14 August 1385. Forces commanded by King John I of Portugal and his general Nuno Álvares Pereira, with the support of English allies, opposed the army of King John I of Castile with its Aragonese, Italian and French allies at São Jorge, between the towns of Leiria and Alcobaça, in central Portugal. The result was a decisive victory for the Portuguese, ruling out Castilian ambitions to the Portuguese throne, ending the 1383–85 Crisis and assuring John as King of Portugal.

Portuguese independence was confirmed and a new dynasty, the House of Aviz, was established. Scattered border confrontations with Castilian troops would persist until the death of John I of Castile in 1390, but these posed no real threat to the new dynasty.

Prelude

The end of the 14th century in Europe was a time of revolution and crisis, with the Hundred Years' War  between the English and the French for Western France, the Black Death devastating the continent, and famine afflicting the poor. Portugal was no exception. In October 1383, King Ferdinand I of Portugal died with no son to inherit the crown. The only surviving child of his marriage with Leonor Telles de Meneses was a girl, Princess Beatrice of Portugal.

In April of that same year the King had signed the Treaty of Salvaterra de Magos with King Juan I of Castile. The treaty determined that Princess Beatrice was to marry Juan I, king of Castile, and the Crown of Portugal would belong to the descendants of this union. This situation left the majority of the Portuguese discontented, and the Portuguese nobility was unwilling to support the claim of the princess because that could mean the incorporation of Portugal into Castile. Also, the powerful merchants of the capital, Lisbon, were enraged at being excluded from the negotiations. Without an undisputed option, Portugal remained without a king from 1383–85, in an interregnum known as the 1383–85 Crisis.

The first clear act of hostility was carried out in December 1383 by the faction of John (João), the Grand Master of the Aviz Order (and a natural son of Peter I of Portugal), with the murder of Count Andeiro. This prompted the Lisbon merchants to name him "rector and defender of the realm". However, the Castilian king would not relinquish his and his wife's claims to the throne. In an effort to normalize the situation and secure the crown for himself or Beatrice, he forced Leonor to abdicate from the regency. In April 1384, in Alentejo, a punitive expedition was promptly defeated by Nuno Álvares Pereira, leading a much smaller Portuguese army at the Battle of Atoleiros. This was an example of the use of the defensive tactic of forming an infantry square to repel cavalry, reportedly without any casualties to the Portuguese.
A larger second expedition led by the Castilian king himself reached and besieged Lisbon for four months in the summer of 1384, before being forced to retreat by a shortage of food supplies due to harassment from Nuno Álvares Pereira, and the bubonic plague.

In order to secure his claim, John of Aviz engaged in politics and intense diplomatic negotiations with both the Holy See and England. In October 1384, Richard II wrote to John (later King John I), regent of Portugal, reporting on negotiations, conducted in England, with John's envoys - Dom Fernando, master of the order of Santiago, and Laurence Fogaça, chancellor of Portugal saying that an agreement had been reached under which a small English contingent was to be sent to Portugal, to help defend the kingdom against its Castilian neighbor. On 6 April 1385, (the anniversary of the "miraculous" battle of Atoleiros, a fortuitous date), the Council of the kingdom (Cortes in Portuguese) assembled in Coimbra and declared him King John I of Portugal. After his accession to the throne, John I of Portugal proceeded to annex the cities whose military commanders supported Princess Beatrice and her husband's claims, namely Caminha, Braga, and Guimarães among others.

Enraged by this "rebellion", Juan I ordered a host of 31,000 men to engage in a two-pronged invasion in May. The smaller Northern force sacked and burnt towns along the border, before being defeated by local Portuguese nobles in the battle of Trancoso, in the first week of June. On the news of the invasion by the Castilians, John I of Portugal's army met with Nuno Álvares Pereira, the Constable of Portugal, in the town of Tomar. There they decided to face the Castilians before they could get close to Lisbon and lay siege to it again.

Mercenaries arrived from Gascony at Easter of 1385, sent to honor the Anglo-Portuguese Treaty of 1373 (still the oldest active international treaty in the world). This company was composed of about 200 English longbowmen, veterans from the Hundred Years' War, and around 500 locally recruited men-at-arms mostly of English and Gascon background, though a Florentine volunteer was also mentioned. 

The Portuguese set out to intercept the invading army near the town of Leiria. Nuno Álvares Pereira took on the task of choosing the ground for the battle. Russell notes that the two Portuguese leaders (Nuno Álvares and Antão Vasques) had already shown themselves masters of the new developments in methods of warfare, i.e. the use of archers and dismounted men-at-arms. The chosen location was São Jorge near Aljubarrota, especially suitable for the chosen military tactic, being a small flattened hill surrounded by creeks, with the very small settlement of Chão da Feira at its widest point, still present today. 

By having his army on the road to Lisbon, John de Avis effectively lured John of Castille's attention from laying siege at the capital itself and morally forced him to offer battle there, on his own terms. As in the Battle of Agincourt, winning this pitched battle would mean a decisive victory for Avis' cause, even with smaller numbers and resources.

Portuguese dispositions
At around 10 o'clock in the morning of 14 August, the army of John I took its position at the north side of this hill, facing the road where the Castilians would soon appear. As in other defensive battles of the 14th century (Bannockburn (1314), Crécy (1346) or Poitiers (1356), for example), the dispositions were as following: dismounted cavalry and infantry in the centre with archers occupying the flanks. Notably, on the vanguard's left wing (later covering the left flank), a company composed by some two hundred unmarried young nobles is remembered to history as the "Ala dos Namorados" (Lovers' Flank); the right wing, also two hundred strong, known as "Ala de Madressilva" or Honeysuckle Flank, didn't achieve the same heroic fame. On either side, the army was protected by natural obstacles (in this case, creeks and steep slopes). In the rear, reinforcements were at hand, commanded by John I of Portugal himself. In this topographically high position, the Portuguese could observe the enemy's arrival and were protected by a steep slope in their front. The rear of the Portuguese position, which was in fact its front in the final battle, was at the top of a narrow slope, which came up to a small village, and was further defended by a complex series of interlocking trenches and caltrops designed to surprise and trap the enemy cavalry. This trenching tactic was developed around this time and used extensively by both the English in France and the Portuguese in the rare set-piece battles of the Crisis of the Succession.

Contrary to previous popular belief that Portuguese men-at-arms on John de Avis' side were badly equipped, and that his foot soldiers were almost with no armor, there's no reason to believe the Portuguese knightly class, even the ones that remained at Master de Avis' side — as most of the upper nobility supported John of Castille, were not able to afford the knightly harness expected in the same Iberian standards of its time. And while the Portuguese primary sources use the comparative inferiority of Portuguese equipment to increase the glory of their victory, this should be considered by the light that most of the action made by John of Castille's side was enjoyed by heavily armored men-at-arms, and by jinete light cavalry armed with at least a combination of mail and padded armor.

Frei Pedro, in his sermon given at Lisbon after the battle, describes the Portuguese equipment: "The Portuguese [...] were poorly and badly armed; here, the one that had mail armor didn't have padded armor, and the one that had a cuirass didn't have arm harness, and many of them with open-faced bascinets. So that if all their arms were matched as they should, it won't equip a third of the people". While this equipment would be inferior to the standards expected from a man-at-arms, it would otherwise be well adequate for actual infantry, which composed most of Lisbon's host. Other sources mention Portuguese arms as: "everyone's defensive arms were bascinets with camail, either open-faced or with visor, and coats of plates, padded armor, mail shirts, mail skirts and cuirasses; and for offensive spears and pollaxes of iron and lead, and axes for those who could have them".

Castile arrives

The Castilian vanguard arrived from the north around midday. Seeing the strongly defensive position occupied by the Portuguese, John of Castile decided to avoid combat on John of Portugal's terms. Slowly, due to the numbers of his army (about 31,000 men), the Castilian army started to contour the hill where the Portuguese were. John of Castile's scouts had noticed that the South side of the hill had a gentler slope and it was there that the Castilian king wanted to attack.

In response to this movement, the Portuguese army inverted its dispositions and headed to the South slope of the hill. Since they were fewer than the enemy and had less ground to cover, they attained their final position very early in the afternoon. To calm the soldiers' nervousness and to improve his army's defensive position, general Nuno Álvares Pereira ordered the construction of a system of ditches, pits and caltrops. This application of typical English tactical procedures had also been used by the Portuguese in the previous battle of Atoleiros and was especially effective against cavalry (the speciality of both the Castilian and the French armies).

Around six o'clock in the afternoon the Castilian army was ready for battle. According to John of Castile, in his report of the battle, his soldiers were by then very tired from the march that had started early in the morning under a blazing August sun. There was no time to halt then, and the battle would soon begin.

Battle

The initiative of starting the battle was with the Castilian side. The French allied heavy cavalry charged in full strength, in order to disrupt order in the enemy lines. According to Jean Froissart, based on ocular testimonies of the battle: "The French knights amounted to two thousand, as gallant lances as could be seen. The moment they perceived the enemy they formed in close order, like men of resolution who knew their business, and advanced within bow-shot". 

As was customary in many wars the French cavalry participated during this period, their impulsive advance proved catastrophic, as they were too far from the rest of the Castillian army to get any support, and were met uphill with obstacles, a narrow passage and a shower of arrows and crossbow bolts, which killed many horses, injured some men, and caused confusion. The French, however, being heavily armored, still made it into the vanguard, where heavy fighting was issued with the Portuguese and Anglo-Gascon men-at-arms. The losses of the cavalry were heavy and the effect of its attack completely null. Support from the Castilian rear was late to come and the knights that did not perish in the combat were made prisoners and sent to the Portuguese rear..

Froissart claims envy was the reason behind why the Spaniards were undisposed to help the French, held to be the best heavy cavalry of Europe, and highly prized by the King of Castile himself:

"It is also true, that the battle began too soon; but they did so to acquire greater honour, and to make their words good which they had said in the presence of the king. On the other hand, as I have heard, the Castillians made no great haste to advance, for the French were not in good favour with them, and they had said, "Let them begin the fight, and tire themselves: they will find enough to do. These Frenchmen are too great boasters, and too vainglorious, and our king has not any perfect confidence but in them. Since he wishes that they should have the honour of the day, it shall be so; for we will have it our own way, or not at all." Conformably to this resolution, the Spaniards kept in a large body, twenty thousand at least, in the plain, and would not advance, which vexed the king much; but he could not help it, for they said, "My lord, it is all over, (though none had returned from the battle): these French knights have defeated your enemies: the honour and victory of the day are theirs.".

As few of the Frenchmen managed to escape, most were either slain or taken prisoner. When the main Castilian force entered the battle, they caused a great impression due to their order, equipment, and numbers. In order to get to the Portuguese line, however, the Castilians became disorganized, squeezing into the space between the two creeks that protected the flanks. At this time, the Portuguese reorganized. The vanguard of Nuno Álvares Pereira divided into two sectors. John of Portugal ordered the archers and crossbowmen to retire, while his rear troops advanced through the space opened between the vanguards. With all his troops needed at the front, there were no men available to guard the knight prisoners; John of Portugal ordered them to be killed on the spot and proceeded to deal with the approaching Castilians.. According to Froissart, however, Avis' war council decided to slay their prisoners before the main body of Castile arrived, after the French cavalry failure, killing many knights, esquires and non-noble men-at-arms ..

Advancing uphill with the sun on their backs, squashed between the funnelling Portuguese defensive works and their own advancing rear, and under a heavy rain of English longbowmen's arrows shot from behind the Portuguese line and crossbow quarrels from behind both the Sweethearts' and the Honeysuckle wings on their flanks, the Castilians fought to win the day. The Castilian knights in the main body were forced to dismount and break in half their four-metre-long lances in order to join the constricted melèe alongside their infantry.

At this stage of the battle, both sides sustained heavy losses, especially on the "Ala dos Namorados" where the Portuguese students became renowned for holding off the heavily armoured knights of the Castilian wings who, still on horseback, attempted to flank the Portuguese lines. A similar attack was more successful on the right "Honeysuckle" flank, though only briefly and late in the fight.

By sunset, only one hour after the battle began, the Castilian position was indefensible. When the Castilian royal standard-bearer fell, the already demoralized troops in the rear thought their King was dead and started to flee in panic; in a matter of moments this became a general rout where Juan of Castile had to run at full speed to save his life, leaving behind not only common soldiers but also many still dismounted noblemen.

The Portuguese pursued them down the hill and, with the battle won, killed many more while there was still light enough to see the enemy. 

King John de Avis, described as tall and strong, made a great impression during the battle, first mounted in a stallion covered in horse caparison with the arms of Portugal, but later described during the méele at the pass, giving hard strokes with his pollaxe and "knocking down three or four of the stoutest of the enemy, insomuch that none dared to approach him". The pollaxe, which seems to have been his favorite weapon, substituted the honoured place of the longsword during his funeral procession.

Aftermath

During the night and throughout the next day, as many as 5000 more Castilians were killed by the neighbouring inhabitants; according to Portuguese tradition surrounding the battle, there was a woman called Brites de Almeida, the Padeira de Aljubarrota (the baker-woman of Aljubarrota), said to be very tall and strong, and to possess six fingers on each hand, who by herself killed seven Castilian soldiers as they were hiding in her bakery in the town of Aljubarrota after the battle. This story is clouded in legend and hearsay, but the popular intervention in the massacre of Castilian troops after the battle is, nevertheless, historical and typical of battles in this period, when there was no mercy toward the defeated enemy.

On the morning of the following day, the true dimension of the battle was revealed. In the field, the bodies of Castilians were enough to dam the creeks surrounding the small hill. In face of this, the Portuguese King offered the enemy survivors an amnesty and free transit home. Leading figures of the Castilian nobility perished that day, as well as complete army units (such as that of the Castilian city of Soria). An official period of mourning was decreed in Castile that would last until the Christmas of 1387.

In October 1385, Nuno Álvares Pereira led a pre-emptive attack against Mérida, in Castilian territory, defeating an even larger Castilian army than at Aljubarrota in the battle of Valverde, in Valverde de Mérida.
Scattered border skirmishes with Castilian troops would persist for five years more until the death of John I of Castile in 1390, but posed no real threat to the Portuguese crown; recognition from Castile would arrive only in 1411 with the signing of the Treaty of Ayllón (Segovia).

This victory of Aljubarrota confirmed John of Aviz as the uncontested King of Portugal and the House of Aviz ascended to the crown of Portugal. In 1386, the closeness of relations between Portugal and England resulted in a permanent military alliance with the Treaty of Windsor, the oldest still active in existence.

John's marriage to Philippa of Lancaster in 1387 initiated the Portuguese second dynasty, and their children went on to make historically significant contributions. Duarte, or Edward of Portugal, became the eleventh King of Portugal known as "The Philosopher" and "The Eloquent", and his brother Prince Henrique, or Henry the Navigator, sponsored expeditions to Africa.

To celebrate his victory and acknowledge divine help, John I of Portugal ordered the construction of the monastery of Santa Maria da Vitória na Batalha and the founding of the town of Batalha close to the site where the battle was fought. the monastery represents one of the best original examples of Late Gothic architecture in Portugal, intermingled with the Manueline style.The king, his wife Philippa of Lancaster, and several of his sons are buried in this monastery. 

In 1393, a chapel in honor of St. Mary and St. George was erected in the place where the standard of D. Nuno Álvares Pereira had been during the confrontation, allowing us to know the precise geographic location of the battle site.

In 1958, archeologist Afonso do Paço organized the first campaign of excavations, revealing the complex defensive system consisting of about 800 pits and dozens of defensive ditches and revealing one of the best preserved battlefields of the period of the Hundred Years' War.

In March 2002, under the initiative of António Champalimaud, the Battle of Aljubarrota Foundation was created. The first of its activities was to recover the battlefield of Aljubarrota. Through a protocol established by the Ministry of Defense in August 2003, the Foundation received authorization to transform the Military Museum into a modern Interpretation Center of the Battle of Aljubarrota. This Interpretation Center was inaugurated on October 11, 2008.

On December 28, 2010, the Portuguese Official Journal published the Decret-Law n.º 18/2010, which states the legal recognition of the battlefield of Aljubarrota with the category of "National Monument".

Sources

Edward McMurdo, The History of Portugal (2); The History of Portugal from the Reign of D. Diniz to the reign of D. Afonso V, General Books LLC, (2009)

A. H. de Oliveira Marques, História de Portugal 
Luís Miguel Duarte, Batalhas da História de Portugal- Guerra pela Independência, Lisboa, QUIDNOVI, imp. 2006
Charles William Previté-Orton, The Shorter Cambridge Medieval History (2), Cambridge University Press, (1975)
 
("Chronicle of king Fernando I") Crónica de el-rei D. Fernando, first published 1816 in J.F. Correia da Serra, editor, Collecção de livros ineditos de historia portugueza, Vol.IV  Lisbon: Academia das Ciências de Lisboa.
("Chronicle of king John I, Part I & Part II" ) Chronica del Rey D. Ioam I de Boa Memoria, e dos Reys de Portugal o Decimo, Primeira Parte, em Que se contem A Defensam do Reyno até ser eleito Rey & Segunda Parte, em que se continuam as guerras com Castella, desde o Principio de seu reinado ate as pazes , first published 1644, Lisbon: A. Alvarez.

Notes

<li> At this time (14th century), Castile is not synonymous with "Spain". A global Iberian political entity, had first appeared as a Visigothic Kingdom in the very end of the era of the Roman Empire was dismantled after the Muslim invasion of 711. After that, the word "Spain" was used to designate the Iberian peninsula from a geographical and cultural and even political point of view. The proper term which more enlightened scholars use is Iberia, the geographical vast peninsula, encompassing Portugal, an autonomous kingdom since 1139, and several other kingdoms. These other kingdoms eventually agglutinated under one central power, Castile, and named Spain, after Hispania which was hitherto used in the plural (Hispaniae or the Spains) to refer to all of the nations on the Iberia peninsula. The country 'appeared' in the second half of the 15th century, with the marriage of the Catholic Monarchs – Isabel of Castile and Ferdinand of Aragon – the rulers, together, of the Crown of Castile, (the union of the kingdoms of Castile, León, Galicia, Asturias, the Canary Islands and the later conquered kingdom of Granada) and the Crown of Aragon (Aragon, Catalonia, Valencia, the Balearic Islands, Sicily and other territories in the Italian Peninsula).

References

External links
 

1385 in Europe
Aljubarrota 1385
Aljubarrota 1385
Aljubarrota 1385
Aljubarrota 1385
Conflicts in 1385
Aljubarrota